The Spring and Autumn Annals of the Sixteen Kingdoms, also known by its Chinese title Shiliuguo Chunqiu is a Chinese biographical historical work of the Sixteen Kingdoms compiled by the Northern Wei official Cui Hong between 501 and 522. It became one of the chief sources for the compilation of the Book of Wei and Book of Jin.

Parts of the book went missing from the early Tang dynasty and did not survive intact. It originally contained 100 volumes, a preface and a chronological table. By the time of the early Song dynasty, many of them were lost and only about 20 volumes remained, which were quoted extensively by Sima Guang. There are two extant versions dating from the late Ming dynasty, the edition by Tu Qiaosun containing 100 volumes, and the one by He Tang containing 16 volumes, reprinted in the Hanwei Congshu, a compilation of histories. Tu's edition was published for the third time in 1781. Also there is a 100 volumes edition together with a chronological table from the mid-Qing dynasty by Tang Qiu, taken from the edition by He Tang and from other materials.

References

  Zhou, Yiliang, "Shiliuguo Chunqiu" ("Spring and Autumn Annals of the Sixteen Kingdoms"). Encyclopedia of China, 1st ed.
  Chen, Changqi and Zhou, Qun. Shiliuguo Chunqiu Sanyi Kaolue (Studies on the Scatter and Disappearance of "Shiliuguo Chunqiu) Academic Research, 2005, No.7, p. 95-100.
  Franke, Otto, Geschichte des chinesischen Reiches. Eine Darstellung seiner Entstehung, seines Wesens und seiner Entwicklung bis zur neuesten Zeit, Berlin (Walter de Gruyter) 2001 (History of the Chinese realm. A representation of its emergence, its nature and its development up to the most recent time), Volume 3 Anmerkungen, Ergänzungen und Berichtigungen zu Band 1 und 2 Sach- und Namenverzeichnis (Remarks, Additions and Errata for volumes 1 and 2, indices on subjects and names), p. 224. .

Chinese history texts
6th-century history books
Sixteen Kingdoms
Historiography of China
History books about the Jin dynasty (266–420)